Melania was an ancient town on the island of Amorgos. 

The site of Melania is unlocated.

References

Populated places in the ancient Aegean islands
Former populated places in Greece
Amorgos
Lost ancient cities and towns